RK Partizan is a Serbian handball club based in Belgrade. They compete in the Serbian Handball Super League and SEHA League.

History
The original club was founded in 1948. They competed for only a year until 1949. In January 1957, RK Dedinje became part of the Partizan sports society, thus reinstating the club's handball section. They made their Yugoslav Handball Championship debut in 1960. In 1973, the club suffered relegation from the league. They made a comeback to the top flight in 1991, shortly before the withdrawal of Croatian and Slovenian teams due to the Yugoslav Wars. The club would win three consecutive championships in 1993, 1994 and 1995, including back-to-back doubles in 1993 and 1994. They later participated in the EHF Champions League on four occasions (1999–2000, 2003–04, 2011–12 and 2012–13). The club also reached the semi-finals of the EHF Cup Winners' Cup (1998–99 and 2001–02) and EHF Challenge Cup (2010–11).

Honours
Serbia and Montenegro League / Serbian League
 1992–93, 1993–94, 1994–95, 1998–99, 2001–02, 2002–03 / 2008–09, 2010–11, 2011–12
Yugoslav Winter Championship
 1963
Yugoslav Cup / Serbia and Montenegro Cup / Serbian Cup
 1958–59, 1965–66, 1970–71 / 1992–93, 1993–94, 1997–98, 2000–01 / 2006–07, 2007–08, 2011–12, 2012–13
Serbian Super Cup
 2009, 2011, 2012

Sponsorship
During its history, the club has been known by a variety of names due to sponsorship reasons:
 Partizan MAG
 Partizan Si&Si (2005–2009)
 Partizan Dunav osiguranje (2009–2010)

Supporters
Grobari (Serbian Cyrillic: Гробари, English: Gravediggers or Undertakers)  are one of two major football fan groups in Serbia. They generally support all clubs within the Partizan multi-sports club, and mostly wear black and white symbols, which are the club's colors.

Team

Goalkeepers
 16  Andrej Trnavac
1  Ivan Mihajlov
 12  Aćim Beloševac
 21  Andrej Čolović
 79  Srđan Đorđević
Left wingers
 27  Aleksa Maksić
 10  Boris Radivojević
 23  Aleksandar Praštalo
Right Wingers
 17  Uroš Kojadinović
5  Nemanja Živković 
Line players
 22  Ivan Mićić
 55  Martin Varga

Left Backs
2  Luka Dragović
 33  Stefan Petrić
 19  Nikola Zečević 
3  Milomir Radovanović
Right backs 
 20  Nenad Mandić
 25  Veljko Popović
 33  Stefan Petrić
6  Đorđe Pisarić
 15  Nikola Ivanović

Notable players
The list includes players who played for their respective national teams in any major international tournaments, such as the Olympic Games, World Championships and European Championships:

  Aleksandar Glendža
  Vuk Lazović
  Rade Mijatović
  Vladimir Osmajić
  Radivoje Ristanović
  Zoran Roganović
  Ilija Abutović
  Nemanja Ilić
  Vanja Ilić
  Miloš Kostadinović
  Lazar Kukić
  Dragan Marjanac
  Mijajlo Marsenić
  Savo Mešter
  Strahinja Milić
  Dejan Milosavljev
  Uroš Mitrović
  Živan Pešić
  Bogdan Radivojević
  Stevan Sretenović
  Ivan Stanković
  Darko Stevanović
  Rastko Stojković
  Aleksandar Stojanović (handballer)
  Nikola Adžić
  Mladen Bojinović
  Zoran Đorđić
  Ratko Đurković
  Nikola Eklemović
  Nedeljko Jovanović
  Petar Kapisoda
  Aleksandar Knežević
  Branko Kokir
  Jovan Kovačević
  Blažo Lisičić
  Nenad Maksić
  Vladimir Mandić
  Vladan Matić
  Dragan Momić
  Predrag Peruničić
  Nenad Puljezević
  Dane Šijan
  Vladica Stojanović
  Goran Stupar
  Dragan Sudžum
  Alem Toskić
  Abas Arslanagić
  Časlav Grubić
  Milan Kalina
  Radivoje Krivokapić
  Dobrivoje Selec
  Goran Stojanović

Head coaches

  Marijan Flander
  Radosav Mutić
  Srđan Praljak
  Petar Eror
  Vilim Tičić
  Petar Lazarević
  Zoran Pantazis
  Dragan Stevanović
  Kosta Veselinović
  Vitomir Arsenijević
  Vlatko Martinčević
  Vladimir Cindrić
  Vojislav Malešević
  Branislav Petković
  Momčilo Jovanović
  Đorđe Vučinić
  Miodrag Savić
  Milan Tomaš
  Radomir Diklić
  Mihajlo Obradović
  Vasilije Đokić
  Mihajlo Obradović (1990–1991)
  Kasim Kamenica (1991–1992)
  Jovica Elezović (1992–1995)
  Mile Isaković (1995)
  Jovica Elezović (1995–1996)
  Nikola Adžić (1996–1997)
  Ljubomir Obradović (1997–1998)
  Jovica Elezović (1998–1999)
  Dušan Medić (1999)
  Jezdimir Stanković (1999)
  Zlatan Arnautović (1999)
  Veselin Vujović (1999–2000)
  Branko Štrbac (2000–2001)
  Mile Malešević (2001)
  Vuk Roganović (2001)
  Zoran Kurteš (2001–2003)
  Marko Isaković (2003)
  Branko Štrbac (2004)
  Zoran Kurteš (2004)
  Časlav Dinčić (2004–2005)
  Branislav Pokrajac (2006)
  Marko Isaković (2006)
  Nikola Jevremović (2006–2007)
  Zoran Ivić (2007)
  Saša Bošković (2008–2010)
  Aleksandar Brković (2010–2014)
  Nenad Maksić (2014–2018)
  Bojan Butulija (2018–2019)
  Željko Radojević (2019)
  Nenad Maksić (2020–present)

References

External links
  
 RK Partizan – EHF competition record
 RK Partizan at srbijasport.net 

Partizan
Handball clubs established in 1948
1948 establishments in Yugoslavia
Sport in Belgrade